Njål Sparbo (born May 13, 1964) is a Norwegian classical bass-baritone singer.

Njål Sparbo is a merited oratorio singer with more than 50 major oratorioes on his repertoire, and he has sung leading parts in a number of opera productions. He is an advocate of contemporary music and has sung numerous world premiere performances. His solo engagements include all the major Norwegian choirs and orchestras, The Norwegian National Opera, and venues all over Europe, including Russia, the U.S., Japan and South-Korea. Sparbo has had more than 150 Lieder recitals together with Norway's leading pianists, and his recordings of "Grieg & Schubert: Songs", and Franz Schubert’s "Winterreise", have been praised.

(Exemplary Sparbo, brilliant Schubert: ... I must give him my unreserved congratulations to a recording which leaves you with a sense of loss from the moment it ceases. It is in fact not just the work itself that so strongly spellbinds the listener in me, it is equally Sparbo's interpretation ... Espen Mineur Sætre, Morgenbladet).

Sparbo has released the first two recordings of a CD-anthology of Norwegian songs: "Norge, mitt Norge!", and "Natt og Dag".

He performs regularly at festivals and on television/radio. Among his performances are Mahler’s ”Lieder eines fahrendes Gesellen” with the Academy of St. Martin in the Fields in London, Bach’s ”Christmas Oratorio” with the Drottningholm's Baroque Orchestra in Uppsala and Rossini’s ”Petite Messe Sollenelle” in Köln Philharmonie, Kverno's "St. Matthew Passion" in New York City and Manoa in Handel's "Samson" at the London Handel Festival.

Sparbo has been awarded numerous awards and scholarships, among from the Wallenberg stipend fund, Klæstad's endowment, Fegersten's endowment, Ingrid Bjoner's scholarship and the Kirsten Flagstad Prize. After a series of concerts performing all the songs by Edvard Grieg, he received the Grieg Prize in 2009 from the Edvard Grieg museum Troldhaugen for his contributions to renew the musical interpretation tradition in Grieg's songs, particularly by bringing up the dramatic scope.

Sparbo has held The Norwegian Government Grant for Artists (1997-1999 and 2005-2008) to study Art song and Contemporary Norwegian song repertoire. In 2009-2014 he worked as a research fellow at the Oslo National Academy of the Arts in The Norwegian Artistic Research Fellowship Programme with the project «Singing on the Stage - with a Psychophysical Approach» - merging different aspects of artistic performance practice with the Norwegian psychomotor tradition. He has continued as a researcher of psychophysical stage presence, combining contemporary aesthetics with the tradition of Norwegian Psychomotor Therapy. He has coached a number of choirs and vocal ensembles, including The Oslo Philharmonic Choir, and has had engagements as associate professor at the Academy of Opera and at the Academy of Ballet at the Oslo National Academy of the Arts. In 2014-15 he joined the research group "The Reflective Musician" at the National Academy of Music in Oslo in the Project Program for Artistic Development, and he is currently part of a research group at the University of Bergen with the project: "(Un-) settling Sites and Styles: Performers in Search of New Expressive Means".

Sparbo has conducted peer reviews at The Norwegian Academy of Music, at The Norwegian University of Science and Technology, and the University College of Opera in Stockholm and has been a member of The Artists' Union Scholarship Committee. He is a board member of the International Grieg Society, and has been managing director of Oslo Grieg Society, festival director of the Oslo Grieg Festival and member of the Norwegian Operatic Association. As an entrepreneur, he has founded several websites and the record company Quattro Records.

External links
Njål Sparbos home page
Quattro Records

Living people
Norwegian male singers
People educated at Oslo Waldorf School
1964 births